Hungkiichthys is an extinct genus of prehistoric bony fish that lived during the Late Jurassic epoch.

References

External links
 

Prehistoric teleostei
Late Jurassic fish